Sami (Arabic: سَمِيع samī‘), also spelt as Samee and Sameeh, is an Arabic male given name literal meaning is "one who hears" or "sharp, keen hearing", "keen, vigorous, intense attentiveness [listening]", "pious, loyal, dutiful, obedient, compliant", "hearer, listener". The name is an exaggerated form which stems from the original form of the male given name Sami (Arabic: سَامِع sāmi‘). 

Al-Samī‘ or As-Samī‘ (Arabic: السَمِيع) is one of the names of Allah meaning the" All-Hearer/ All-Hearing" - which the common expression that it is only Allah who hears and responds. According to Islamic tradition, a Muslim may not be given any of the names of God in exactly the same form. Likewise nobody may be named As-Samee (The All Hearing), but may be named Samee (Hearer). This is because of the belief that God is almighty and no human being is the equivalent to God.

Sami is also given name in Scandinavia, America and many other countries. It has different origins and meanings. For example, the Arabic Sami means elevated or sublime. When spelled in English, it can be spelled as Sammy and often mistakenly confused as the abbreviated English name Sammy.

It is a convention to use either a prefix "Abd-" or a suffix "-Ullah" along the name, which gives meanings of Abdul Sami/ Abdul Samee - "the servant/slave of All-Hearer/ All-Hearing" or Samiullah/ Sameeullah - "All-Hearer/ All-Hearing of God" respectively.

The female form of this name in Arabic is Samiya (سامية) meaning "one who listens".

People 
 Mohammad Abdul-Samee Al-Dmeiri
 Samiya Mumtaz

See also
Sami (name)

References 

Given names
Arabic masculine given names
Pakistani masculine given names